"Into Dust" is a song by American duo Mazzy Star that appears as the ninth track on their second album So Tonight That I Might See.  The song's arrangement is sparse and features only acoustic guitar and cello as accompaniment to the vocals.

Although never released as an official single, the song has charted on two occasions on the UK Singles Chart. Fifteen years after the release of the album, the song charted at #71 in August 2009 following its appearance on a commercial for Virgin Media. Two years later, the song spent a further four weeks on the chart, reaching a new peak of #47, when it was used on the "Dust to Dust" trailer for Gears of War 3. In September 2011, "Into Dust" made its début appearance on the Irish Singles Chart, where it reached a peak of #40.

Charting positions

Covers versions and remixes
 A cover by Ashtar Command appeared on The O.C. soundtrack album Music from the OC: Mix 6. This version originally appeared in "The Chrismukk-huh?" (Season 4, Episode 6).
 A trance remix by John O'Callaghan appeared on A State of Trance Episode 327.
 A cover by heavy metal band In This Moment on album Mother released in 2020.

In popular culture

In film
 The song featured in the 1996 film Foxfire, starring Angelina Jolie.
 It was used, along with Among My Swan'''s "Take Everything", in the 2004 film In My Father's Den.
 It also featured in the 2007 film Rails & Ties, starring Kevin Bacon.
 It appears in 2018 film A Million Little Pieces, starring Aaron Taylor-Johnson, Billy Bob Thornton, Odessa Young.

In television
 "Into Dust" appeared in three different episodes of The O.C. It featured extensively as the outro on the "Pilot" episode of season 1, in the end scene in 1x07 "The Escape" and also on the season 4 episode "The Chrismukk-huh?"
 It was used in the Charmed episode "A Knight to Remember".
 It featured in the series House, in the third season episode "Informed Consent".
 It featured in the series World Shut Your Mouth in 2005.
 It was in Standoff in the episode "Road Trip"  in June of 2007
 The track was used in an episode of Canterbury's Law titled "Baggage".
 "Into Dust" was in the Moonlight episode "Fever".
 In September 2009, it was used on one of the final episodes of Hollyoaks Later and later in a February 2010 episode of Hollyoaks.
 On October 21, 2012, "Into Dust" appeared in the TV series 666 Park Avenue episode "Hero Complex".
 On April 29, 2013, in the third episode of Rectify. It was used again in the third episode of the second season, which aired June 26, 2014.
 It was used at the end of "Episode Three" of Babylon.
 In July 2016, "Into Dust" was used in the first episode of the miniseries The Night Of.
 This song plays at the conclusion of the season 2 finale of NBC's Superstore.
 In April 2018, this song was played in season 4 episode 8 of the Amazon Prime series Bosch.
 In August 2018, it is featured in the History Channel's Six Episode "Danger Close".
 In March 2019, it was played in New Amsterdam Season 1 Episode 16 "King of Swords".
 In August 2019, it was played in the final scene of The Handmaid's Tale Season 3 Episode 13 "Mayday".
 In April 2020, it was featured in the fifth episode of the Sky TV drama Save Me.
 In April 2020, it was played in The Blacklist Season 7 Episode 16 "Nyle Hatcher".
 In July 2022, it was played in Resident Evil Season 1 Episode 3 "The Light".
 In November 2022, it was played in The English Episode 2 "Path of the Dead".
 In January 2023, it was played in Quantum Leap Episode 10 "Paging Dr. Song".

In games
 The track was used in the trailer "Dust to Dust" for Gears of War 3''.

References

1993 songs
Mazzy Star songs